Richard Berry Jr. House may refer to:

 Richard Berry Jr. House (Columbus, Ohio)
 Richard Berry Jr. House (Springfield, Kentucky)